The Tatra 605 manufactured by Tatra was a 2-seater racing car in 1957. The 340 kg T605 was enveloped in a 2-piece aerodynamic body. It was propelled by a 0.6-litre 2-cylinder rear-mounted engine (basically one-fourth of the Tatra 603 engine) giving  and a  top speed.

605